The discography of Tinie Tempah, a British rapper, contains three studio albums, two extended plays, twenty-three singles (including eight as a featured artist) and thirty-two music videos.

Tinie released his debut single "Pass Out" in February 2010. Featuring the track's producer Labrinth, the single debuted at number one on the UK chart. "Frisky" was released in June 2010 as Tinie's second single, which debuted at number two in the UK and number three in Ireland. The rapper's debut studio album Disc-Overy (2010) reached number one in the United Kingdom, where it has since been certified as double platinum by the British Phonographic Industry (BPI). An additional two singles preceded the release of the album: "Written in the Stars", which features Eric Turner and "Miami 2 Ibiza", a collaboration with Swedish House Mafia; the latter of which reached number four in the UK. "Written in the Stars" saw Tinie attain international chart success, reaching number twelve on the Billboard Hot 100, which also became his second number one single in the United Kingdom. The singles "Invincible", featuring Kelly Rowland; "Wonderman", featuring Ellie Goulding; "Simply Unstoppable" and "Till I'm Gone", featuring Wiz Khalifa were all released from Disc-Overy, reaching peaks of number eleven, number twelve, number thirty-three and number twenty-four respectively in the United Kingdom.

The campaign for Tinie's second studio album Demonstration (2013) was launched in August 2013 with the release of "Trampoline". Featuring 2 Chainz, the single debuted at number three in the United Kingdom and became Tinie's fifth UK top ten hit in the process. "Children of the Sun", which features John Martin, was released in October 2013 ahead of the album, reaching a peak of number six. Demonstration was released on 4 November in the United Kingdom and debuted at number three, also reaching peaks of number twenty-two in Australia and number forty in New Zealand.

Albums

Studio albums

Mixtapes

Extended plays

Singles

As lead artist

As featured artist

Promotional singles

Other charted songs

Notes
  - The song was released for download following a performance at the 2011 BRIT Awards and was a mash-up of singles "Written in the Stars", "Miami 2 Ibiza" and "Pass Out".

Guest appearances

Music videos

References

Notes

Sources

Discographies of British artists
Hip hop discographies